Sudam Deshmukh (30 April 1923 – 15 May 1993) was an Indian politician. He was elected to the Lok Sabha, the lower house of the Parliament of India as a member of the Communist Party of India.

References

External links
Official biographical sketch in Parliament of India website

1923 births
1993 deaths
India MPs 1989–1991
Communist Party of India politicians from Maharashtra
Lok Sabha members from Maharashtra